Mantee may refer to:

 Mantee, Mississippi, a village
 Paul Mantee (1931-2013), American actor
 Duke Mantee, the villain of the film The Petrified Forest, played by Humphrey Bogart